Tabula Banasitana is an inscribed bronze tablet produced in the second century AD. Found in 1957 near the village of Banasa in Morocco, it documents how a notable of the Berber tribe of Zegrenses successfully petitioned to receive Roman citizenship for him and his family. Fergus Millar has noted its importance as "perhaps our finest documentary item of evidence for the archival procedures of the Roman emperors and for the limits and consequences of granting citizenship, as well as affording some glimpses of social structure in a marginal area of the empire." The text was published for the first time in 1971. The tablet is currently at the Museum of History and Civilizations in Rabat.

The Latin text on the tablet consists of three parts: a grant from the emperors Marcus Aurelius and Lucius Verus to the Zegrensis Julianus, his wife Ziddina and their four sons in 168/169; a second grant from Marcus Aurelius and Commodus to Faggura, the wife of Aurelius Julianus, the princeps of the Zegrenses, probably the son of the earlier Julianus, and their children in 177; and an authenticated copy of the entry from the central register with the names of twelve senior figures, senators and equestrians.

References

Bibliography

External links 
 Text and transcription at ancientrome.ru
 Tabula Banasitana at Latin Wikisource

Latin inscriptions
Roman citizenship
Mauretania Tingitana
2nd-century inscriptions